MRT Retail Sdn. Bhd. doing business as Kedai Rakyat 1Malaysia (KR1M) (unofficial English title: 1Malaysia Grocery Stores)  is a government owned chain of convenience stores in Malaysia. It was established as part of the national campaign of 1Malaysia. Due to low turnout rate and support from nation, it has shutdown nationwide shops in 2017.

History
In 2011, the 1Malaysia franchise was branched off into a grocery store franchise going by the name Kedai Rakyat 1Malaysia (KR1M), with the first store being located at the Kelana Jaya Line Light Rail Transit (LRT) station in Kelana Jaya. The franchise was aimed at allowing the low income group to obtain cheaper groceries and lightening their burden besides bringing Malaysians closer to the significance of 1Malaysia.

List of KR1M branches

Johor
 Tampoi, Johor Bahru
 Taman Johor Jaya, Johor Bahru
 Pontian
 Kota Tinggi
 Kluang
 Mersing
 Bukit Pasir, Muar
 Tangkak
 Labis

Kedah
 Kulim
 Sungai Petani
 Gurun
 Pendang
 Alor Setar
 Jitra
 Padang Serai
 Sik
 Baling

Kelantan
 Kota Bharu
 Bukit Bunga
 Tok Bali
 Tanah Merah

Malacca
 Taman Limbongan Permai, Malacca
 Tengkera, Malacca
 Urban Transformation Centre (UTC), Malacca
 Malacca International Trade Centre (MITC), Ayer Keroh
 Klebang, Malacca
 Serkam
 Selandar

Negeri Sembilan
 Tampin
 Kuala Pilah
 Bahau
 Rantau
 Wakaf Mart, Senawang
 Bandar Springhill
 Lukut
 Port Dickson

Pahang
 Kuantan
 Bandar Baru Jaya Gading, Kuantan
 Pekan
 Bandar Baru Rompin
 Maran
 Bandar Pusat Jengka
 Jerantut
 Temerloh
 Bera
 Raub
 Bentong
 Muadzam Shah

Perak
 Pengkalan Hulu
 Parit Buntar
 Bagan Serai
 Batu Kurau
 Kamunting
 Manjoi, Ipoh
 Seri Manjung
 Tapah
 Teluk Intan

Penang
 Butterworth
 Tasek Gelugor
 Bukit Mertajam (Kota Permai)

Perlis
 Kangar
 Arau

Sabah
 Kota Kinabalu
 Sandakan
 Tawau
 Inanam
 Tuaran
 Papar
 Lahad Datu
 Kota Belud
 Ranau
 Tenom
 Sipitang
 Keningau
 Long Pasia
 Putatan

Sarawak
 Medan Hamidah, Kuching
 Kota Pedawan, Kuching
 Mambong, Serian
 Betong Newtownship
 Lundu
 Satok
 Batu Kawah
 Kota Sentosa
 Kota Samarahan
 Padungan
 Serian Bazaar
 Sri Aman
 Lubok Antu
 Pusa
 Saratok
 Sarikei (as shown in photo above)
 Sibu Trade & Exhibition Centre, Sibu
 Sibu Jaya
 Kanowit
 Mukah
 Tatau
 Kemena Land District, Bintulu
 Sungai Plan, Bintulu
 Sibuti
 Lutong
 Permy Technology Park, Miri
 Limbang
 Lawas

Selangor
 Sungai Besar
 Kuala Selangor
 Bukit Beruntung
 Sungai Buloh
 Port Klang
 Kajang Sentral, Kajang
 Beranang
 Dataran Mentari, Petaling Jaya
 Kelana Jaya LRT station, Kelana Jaya
 Ara Jaya, Petaling Jaya
 Damansara Utama

Terengganu
 Padang Air Puteh, Kemaman
 Dungun
 Kuala Terengganu

Federal Territories

Kuala Lumpur
 Wangsa Maju
 Jalan Raja Laut
 Urban Transformation Centre (UTC), Pudu Sentral
 Pantai Dalam
 Bandar Tun Razak
 Taman Pagar Ruyong, Kuchai Lama

Labuan
None

Putrajaya
 Presint 2
 Presint 16

Public responses to KR1M
Complaints have been made regarding the claims that the groceries sold in at KR1M were more expensive compared to those sold in hypermarkets around Malaysia. This was however been denied by the former Ministry of Domestic Trade, Co-operatives and Consumerism Ismail Sabri. There have been also allegations of poor product quality in its product line, namely children's milk powder, fresh milk, condensed milk, sweetened condensed creamer, oyster sauce, fruit jam, canned chicken curry, mango cordial, ghee compounds, peanuts, peanut butter, crispy peanut butter and fish tinned sardines in tomato sauce. KR1M has instructed its suppliers to send their products for periodical laboratory testing.

References

External links
 

2011 establishments in Malaysia
1Malaysia
Supermarkets of Malaysia